Buzcheh-ye Sofla (also Romanized as Būzcheh-ye Soflá; also known as Būjeh-ye Pā'īn and Būzjeh-ye Soflá) is a village in Aslan Duz Rural District, Aslan Duz District, Parsabad County, Ardabil Province, Iran. At the 2006 census, its population was 323, in 63 families.

References 

Towns and villages in Parsabad County